Blatnica (1927–1946 Turčianska Blatnica) is a village and municipality in the Turiec region of Slovakia. Administratively it is a part of the Martin District in the Žilina Region. The village is situated under the Greater Fatra Range, at the opening of the spectacular karst Gader and Blatnica valleys. The ruins of the Blatnica Castle lie on a low ridge over the village.

Etymology
The name means "a muddy place" ( - mud).

History
Blatnica is an important archaeological site, where Slavic tumuli with many precious artifacts (such as the famous Blatnica Sword) from the 8th and 9th centuries have been found. The site gave name to the so-called "Blatnica-Mikulčice" archaeological horizon. The first written mention stems from 1230, however, the castle was built at the end of the 13th century.

Culture
The first Slovak female botanist Izabela Textorisová lived in Blatnica and her rich herbarium contains plants of the nearby Tlstá mountain. Both Textorisová's house and a museum dedicated to the ethnographer, filmmaker, and photographer Karol Plicka are open to the public. Other places of interest include two manor houses from the 18th century, a classicist Lutheran church and many well-preserved rural houses.

Demographics
Blatnica has a population of 881 (as of December 31, 2005). According to the 2001 census, 99% of inhabitants were Slovaks. Blatnica is one of few villages with a Lutheran absolute majority (58.6%) in the predominantly Roman Catholic Slovakia.

See also
 List of municipalities and towns in Slovakia

References

Genealogical resources

The records for genealogical research are available at the state archive "Statny Archiv in Bytca, Slovakia"

 Roman Catholic church records (births/marriages/deaths): 1777-1949 (parish B)
 Lutheran church records (births/marriages/deaths): 1785-1929 (parish A)

External links
Municipal website 
Basic information about Blatnica and its history
Surnames of living people in Blatnica

Villages and municipalities in Martin District
Archaeological sites in Slovakia